Peeter Lamp (born 9 February 1944) is an Estonian tennis coach and former professional tennis player.

Born and raised in Tartu, Lamp was a two-time singles champion at the Estonian Tennis Championships and featured in main draws at the 1971 French Open. He lost in the first round of the singles to Bernard Montrenaud in five sets.

Lamp, who has captained Estonia in the Davis Cup, was the coach of Anett Kontaveit in 2013 and 2014.

References

External links
 
 

1944 births
Living people
Estonian male tennis players
Soviet male tennis players
Estonian tennis coaches
Tallinn University alumni
Sportspeople from Tartu